Kaipara is a former New Zealand parliamentary electorate north of Auckland that existed from 1902 to 1946, and from 1978 to 1996.

Population centres
The Representation Act 1900 had increased the membership of the House of Representatives from general electorates 70 to 76, and this was implemented through the 1902 electoral redistribution. In 1902, changes to the country quota affected the three-member electorates in the four main centres. The tolerance between electorates was increased to ±1,250 so that the Representation Commissions (since 1896, there had been separate commissions for the North and South Islands) could take greater account of communities of interest. These changes proved very disruptive to existing boundaries, and six electorates were established for the first time, including Kaipara, and two electorates that previously existed were re-established.

The electorate was rural and located north of Auckland city, in the North Auckland region.

History
The first representative was the independent conservative Alfred Harding.

As a (belated) wartime general election was to be held shortly, a by-election was postponed through the By-elections Postponement Act 1943, and Clifton Webb succeeded Coates at the general election in September 1943. When the Kaipara electorate was abolished in 1946, Webb successfully stood in the  electorate.

Kaipara was recreated in 1978, and again replaced by Rodney in 1996. Lockwood Smith then transferred to Rodney, and later became the Speaker of the House.

Members of Parliament
Key

Election results

1943 election

1938 election

1935 election

1931 election

1928 election

1925 election

1922 election

1919 election

1914 election

1911 election

Notes

References

New Zealand electorates in the Auckland Region
Historical electorates of New Zealand
1902 establishments in New Zealand
1946 disestablishments in New Zealand
1996 disestablishments in New Zealand
1978 establishments in New Zealand